Theresia Gouw is an entrepreneur and venture capital investor in the technology sector. She worked at Bain & Company, Release Software and Accel Partners before co-founding Aspect Ventures, a female-led venture capital firm, in 2014. Gouw was named one of the 40 most influential minds in tech by Time Magazine. and has been recognized seven times on the Forbes Midas List as one of the "world's smartest tech investors". According to Forbes.com, Gouw is the richest female venture capitalist, with a net worth of approximately $500 million, primarily due to her involvement with Accel (company)'s early investment in Facebook.

Early years and education

Gouw's family fled Indonesia when she was three to escape the persecution of the country’s ethnic Chinese minority under the Suharto dictatorship. A dentist and a nurse in Jakarta, her parents settled outside Buffalo, New York, working as a dishwasher and a waitress before her father re-earned his dental certification in the United States.

Gouw earned a Bachelor of Science in Engineering from Brown University, graduating magna cum laude, and an MBA from Stanford Graduate School of Business.

Career

Gouw began her career at Bain & Company. She left Bain to become a founding member of Release Software, a startup founded by business school classmates, where she served as Vice President of Business Development & Sales.

After Release Software, Gouw joined Accel Partners, eventually becoming Managing Partner. Her investments included Trulia (TRLA), Imperva (IMPV), LearnVest, JasperDesign, and Kozmix.

In 2014, Gouw co-founded Aspect Ventures with fellow venture capital investor Jennifer Fonstad. Gouw and Fonstad worked together early in their careers at Bain & Company and at Release Software. During the first year, Aspect Ventures made several Series A and seed investments funded by the co-founders' personal capital. In May 2015, Aspect announced it had raised its first $150MM fund, which included outside capital from Limited Partners. The firm has made investments in companies including ForeScout (FSCT), Cato Networks, Exabeam, The Muse, and Crew.

In 2019, Gouw co-founded Acrew Capital with Lauren Kolodny, Vishal Lugani, Asad Khaliq and Mark Kraynak. Acrew's first fund was a ~$250MM fund. They've since announced a new initiative called Acrew Diversify Capital Fund (DCF) to diversify the boards and cap tables of market leading, late stage companies.

Board member and advisor

Gouw sits on the board of directors of several of the companies she has invested in, including Deserve, Cato Networks, ForeScout Technologies (FSCT), Exabeam and The Muse.  She serves as Treasurer on the Brown University Corporation Board. She serves as vice-chair of the board of DonorsChoose, and is a member of the Stanford Graduate School of Business Advisory Council. She also serves on the board of trustees of the Castilleja School.

Honors
 Forbes Midas List (2011, 2012, 2013, 2014, 2016, 2017, 2018)
 Award winner as outstanding leader in tech by World Affairs Global Philanthropy Forum (2016)
 10x Award Honoree by Women 2.0 (2015)
 Named one of "50 most powerful moms in the world" by Harper's Bazaar (2015)
 Named one of the "Time Tech 40: The Most Influential Minds in Tech" by Time Magazine (2013)
 Named one of the "Ten Most Influential Women in Technology" by Time Magazine (2012)
 2019 Great Immigrants Recipient by Carnegie Corp.

Notable speaker & commentator

Speaking
 TEDx SF (2016)
 Web Summit, Lisbon (2016)
 The Wall Street Journal Global Startups Showcase (2016)
 WSJDLIVE (2015)
 Forbes Power Women Summit (2014)
 Fortune The Most Powerful Women Summit (2013)

Commentary
Gouw has provided commentary on a range of topics related to venture capital, technology and finance on CNBC, Bloomberg West, Fox Business, Forbes, Fortune, and the Wall Street Journal.

References

External links 
 www.aspectventures.com
 Theresia Gouw Twitter

1968 births
Living people
American venture capitalists
Stanford Graduate School of Business alumni
Bain & Company employees
American women investors
Indonesian people of Chinese descent
Brown University School of Engineering alumni